Lippendorf is located in the municipality of Neukieritzsch, near Leipzig in Saxony, Germany.
The present town of Lippendorf used to be known as the village of Medewitzsch. In 1934, the towns of Medewitzsch, Lippendorf and Spahnsdorf combined to form the new town of Lippendorf. North of town are Böhlen and Zwenkau, to the east is Rotha, to the south is Neukieritzsch and to the west is Russen-Kleinstorkwitz

The first record of the village of Lippendorf was in 1378.  The character of the place was rural for a long time. Only from the 1920s did the then village develop into an industrial centre, mainly due to the lignite, also called brown coal, formed from naturally compressed peat, found in the area. The first lignite mine in the area was opened in 1924. Böhlen mining started near the north west of the town. The first power station was built in 1925. During World War II bomb attacks on the power station in 1944 and 1945 destroyed parts of the village. In the mid-1960s a second power station was built in the municipality of Spahnsdorf and parts of Lippendorf. The current town was incorporated on 1 January 1973. In 1997 a new lignite-fired power station, the Lippendorf Power Station, was built and the old one was shut down.

The town is not far from the rivers of the White Elster and Pleiße. It is also near the Leipzig Bay and includes parts of the conservation area Elsteraue. The nearest large settlements are the city of Leipzig and town of Borna.

Sights
Information Centre in the power plant
 Katharina Luther (Katharina von Bora) Chapel with plaque, that commemorates Katharina von Bora's birthplace.
 Martin Luther memorials in the main town and the village Neukieritzsch Kieritzsch.

See also

Nuclear power in Germany
Energy policy of the European Union
List of power stations in Germany
Nuclear energy policy
Renewable energy in Germany
 Leipzig–Hof railway of the Saxon Bavarian Railway Company. 
 Neukieritzsch–Chemnitz railway

Notes

References
Time and facts of Lippendorf
citipedia.info Lippendorf
allingrain.com Lippendorf
 zrs-berlin.de New construction of the north east junction for Böhlen-Lippendorf industrial estate, Germany
katiandgraham.com genealogy Luther: Katharina von Bora Female 1499 - 1552  (53 years) born in Lippendorf
lutheranhistory.org  Katharina von Bora
Gemeinden 1994 und ihre Veränderungen seit 01.01.1948 in den neuen Ländern, Verlag Metzler-Poeschel, Stuttgart, 1995, Herausgeber: Statistisches Bundesamt
lippendorf-kieritzsch.de History - 1940 map
Coal Train in Lippendorf
The Luther Trail in Saxony
"500th Anniversary of Katharina von Bora" The Lutheran Journal, Vol. 68, #2, 1999 - Erwin Weber

External links 
 Website der Evangelisch-Lutherischen Kirchgemeinde

Leipzig (district)